Algeria competed at the 1988 Summer Olympics in Seoul, South Korea. 44 competitors, 40 men and 4 women, took part in 29 events in 7 sports.

Competitors
The following is the list of number of competitors in the Games.

Athletics

Men's 100m 

 Moustafa Kamel Salmi
 Heat — 11.08 (→ did not advance)

Men's 200m 

 Moustafa Kamel Salmi
 Heat — 21.24 
 Quarter-Final — 21.26 (→ did not advance)

Men's 800m 

 Réda Abdenouz
 Heat — 1:47.67
 Quarter-Finals — 1:46.97
 Semi-Finals — 1:45.95 (→ did not advance)
 Ahmed Bel Kessam
 Heat — 1:47.96
 Quarter-Finals — 1:46.93 (→ did not advance)

Men's 1,500m 

 Rachid Kram
 Heat — 3:39.90
 Semi-Finals — 3:41.39 (→ did not advance)

Men's Marathon 
 Allaoua Khellil
 Final — 2:21.12 (→ 35th place)

Men's 110m Hurdles 

 Noureddine Tadjine
 Heat — 14.36
 Quarter-Finals — 14.35

Men's 3.000m Steeplechase
 Azzeddine Brahmi
 Heat — 8:35.59
 Semi Final — 8:16.54
 Final — 8:26.68 (→ 13th place)

Men's 20km Racewalk 

 Abdel Wahab Ferguene
 1:26.33 (→ 32nd place)
 Mohamed Bouhalla
 1:27.10 (→ 34th place)

Men's Long Jump 
 Lotfi Khaïda
 Qualification — 7.10m (→ did not advance)

Men's Triple Jump 

 Lotfi Khaïda
 Qualification — 15.68m (→ did not advance)
Men's Hammer Throw
 Hakim Toumi
 Qualifying Heat — 65.78m (→ did not advance)

Women's Heptathlon 
 Yasmina Azzizi
 Final Result — did not start (→ no ranking)

Boxing

Men's Light Flyweight (– 48kg)
 Yacine Cheikh
 First Round — Lost to Henry Martínez (ELS), 0:5

Men's Flyweight (48-51kg) 

 Benaissa Abed

 First Round — Bye
 Second Round — Won against Aissa Moukrim (MAR), 3:2
 Third Round — Won against Emmanuel Nsubuga (UGA), 3:2
 Quarter-Finals — Lost to Andreas Tews (GDR), 5:0 (→ Tied 5th)

Men's Bantamweight (51-54kg) 

 Slimane Zengli

 First Round — Won against Manuel Gomes (ANG), 5:0
 Second Round — Won against Joilson de Santana (BRA), 5:0
 Third Round — Lost to Aleksandr Artemyev (USR), 5:0 (→ Tied 9th)

Men's Lightweight (57-60kg) 

 Azzedine Saïd

 Round One — Won against Lameck Mbao (ZAM), KO in Round 2 at 2:36
 Round Two — Won against Shakes Kubuitsile (BOT), Head Blow in Round 1 at 2:28
 Round Three — Lost to Mohamed Hegazi (EGY), 5:0 (→ Tied 9th)

Men's Light-Middleweight (67-71kg) 

 Noureddine Meziane

 Round One — Lost to Abrar Hussain Syed (PAK), KO in Round 2 at 1:47(→ Tied 32nd)

Men's Middleweight (71-75kg) 

 Ahmed Dine

 First Round — Bye
 Second Round — Lost to Zoltán Füzesy (HUN), 5:0

Cycling

Two male cyclists represented Algeria in 1988.

Men's Road Race 

 Mohamed Mir — Finished 39th
 Sebti Benzine — Finished. 96th

Handball
The Algerians elected to send only a men's team to the 1988 Olympics, with 15 members. One man, Mohamed Machou, did not start. 

They finished the event with a final record of 1 win, 0 ties, and 5 losses, scoring 104 goals while letting in 130 for a point differential of -26. They made 198 attempts on goal, netting them a 52.5% success rate. They were given 12 yellow cards and 21 2-minute suspensions. They played a notably clean series of games, garnering not a single red card or disqualification. They were coached by Mohamed Lamine Aziz Derouaz.

Men's Handball 

 Brahim Bourdrali - Played 6 games, scored 12 times.
 Abdelhak Bouhalissa - Played 3 games, scored 4 times.
 Omar Azzeb - Played 3 games, scored 1 time.
 Ben Ali Beghouach - Played 6 games, scored 7 times.
 Makhlouf Ait Hocine - Played 5 games, scored 15 times.
 Salah Bouchekriou - Plated 6 games, scored 7 times.
 Ahcen Djeffal - Played 5 games, scored 8 times.
 Mahmoud Bouanik - Played 6 games, scored 13 times.
 Fethnour Lacheheb - Played 6 games, scored 4 times.
 Kamel Ouchia - Played 6 games, never scored.
 Abdel Salem Ben Magh Soula - Played 6 games, scored 11 times
 Zineddine Mohamed Seghir - Played 6 games, scored 21 times.
 Abu Sofiane Draouci - Played 2 games, never scored.
 Mourad Boussebt - Played 6 games, scored 1 time.
 Mohamed Machou - Did not start.

Judo

Men's Extra-Lightweight (-60kg) 

 Ali Idir

 Pool A, Round 2 — Won against Phil Takahashi (CAN) via ippon in 1:33
 Pool A, Quarter-Finals — Lost to József Csák (HUN) via koka (→ Tied 14th)

Men's Half-Lightweight (60-65kg) 

 Meziane Dahmani

 Pool B, Round 1 — Lost to Drago Bećanović (YUG) via yusei-gachi (→ Tied 34th)

Men's Lightweight (65-71kg) 

 Mohamed Meridja

 Pool B, Round 2 — Lost to Joaquín Ruiz (ESP) via yuko (→ Tied 19th)

Men's Middleweight (78-86kg) 

 Riad Chibani

 Pool B, Round 2 — Won against William Medina (COL) via waza-ari
 Pool B, Quarter-Finals — Lost to Fabien Canu (FRA) via koka (→ Tied 13th)

Men's Heavyweight (95+kg) 

 Boualem Miloudi

 Pool A, Round 1 — Lost to Stefano Venturelli (ITA) via ippon in 2:04 (→ Tied 19th)

Women's Middleweight (61-66kg)

 Samia Hachemi

 Round 1 — Lost to Hikari Sasaki (JPN) by yusei-gachi
 Repêchage — Lost to Roswitha Hartl (AUS) by ippon in 2:02 (→ Tied 5th)

Tennis

Women's Singles Competition
Warda Bouchabou
 First Round – Lost to Tine Scheuer-Larsen (Denmark) 0–6, 1-6

Weightlifting

Bantamweight (52-56kg) 

 Azzedine Basbas – 10th place, 245kg

Heavyweight II (100-110kg) 

 Omar Yousfi – 14th place, 310kg

References

External links
Official Olympic Reports

Nations at the 1988 Summer Olympics
1988
Olympics